Jonathan Benjamin Edwards (born January 8, 1988) is an American professional baseball pitcher who is currently a free agent. Prior to his time in Japan, he played in Major League Baseball (MLB) for the Texas Rangers, San Diego Padres, and Cleveland Indians.

Career
Edwards attended Keller High School in Keller, Texas.

St. Louis Cardinals
The St. Louis Cardinals selected Edwards in the 14th round of the 2006 Major League Baseball draft as an outfielder. He played in the Cardinals organization until 2010, without appearing in an MLB game.

Independent Baseball
He spent the 2011 season playing independent league baseball for the San Angelo Colts of the United Baseball League and Alpine Cowboys of the Pecos League. He would be the first player from the Pecos League to ever play in the MLB.

Texas Rangers

Edwards signed a minor league contract with the Texas Rangers in 2012 and converted to a pitcher. Edwards was called up to the majors for the first time on August 15, 2014.

San Diego Padres
In August 2015, Edwards was traded from the Rangers to the San Diego Padres for Will Venable. On December 20, 2016, Edwards signed a minor league contract with the Padres. He was released on March 28, 2017.

Cleveland Indians
On March 22, 2018, Edwards signed a minor league contract with the Cleveland Indians. The Indians promoted Edwards to the major leagues on September 1. On September 1, 2019, Edwards was designated for assignment. After clearing waivers, Edwards was outrighted to the Triple-A Columbus Clippers on September 3, 2019. Edwards elected free agency on November 4, 2019.

Hanshin Tigers
On December 21, 2019, Edwards signed with the Hanshin Tigers of Nippon Professional Baseball (NPB).

References

External links

1988 births
Living people
Akron RubberDucks players
Alpine Cowboys players
Arizona League Rangers players
Baseball players from Chicago
Batavia Muckdogs players
Cleveland Indians players
Columbus Clippers players
El Paso Chihuahuas players
Frisco RoughRiders players
Johnson City Cardinals players
Leones de Ponce players
Major League Baseball pitchers
Myrtle Beach Pelicans players
Quad Cities River Bandits players
Round Rock Express players
San Angelo Colts players
San Diego Padres players
Spokane Indians players
Texas Rangers players